Gymnetis drogoni is a species of scarab beetle in the family Scarabaeidae, named after the dragon Drogon in the fantasy novel series A Song of Ice and Fire.

References

Cetoniinae
Beetles described in 2018